Natalya Yuryevna Cygankova, (former Lapitskaya),, born August 12 1962, is a Russian former handball player who competed for the Soviet Union in the 1988 Summer Olympics.

In 1988 she won the bronze medal with the Soviet team. She played all five matches and scored 17 goals.

External links
profile

1962 births
Living people
Soviet female handball players
Russian female handball players
Olympic handball players of the Soviet Union
Handball players at the 1988 Summer Olympics
Olympic bronze medalists for the Soviet Union
Olympic medalists in handball
Medalists at the 1988 Summer Olympics